Coelacanthopsis is an extinct genus of lobe-finned fish which lived during the Carboniferous period.

Some place it in the family Rhabdodermatidae.

References

Coelacanthiformes
Prehistoric lobe-finned fish genera
Carboniferous bony fish